Syarhey Kuzminich (born 29 January 1977) is a retired Belarusian professional football coach and former player.

Honours
Gomel
Belarusian Cup winner: 2010–11

External links
 Profile at FC Gomel website
 

1977 births
Living people
Belarusian footballers
Association football defenders
FC Lokomotiv Vitebsk (defunct) players
FC Torpedo Mogilev players
FC Vitebsk players
FC Darida Minsk Raion players
FC Naftan Novopolotsk players
FC Torpedo-BelAZ Zhodino players
FC Gomel players
Belarusian football managers
FC Krumkachy Minsk managers
FC Minsk managers